The 2019 Swedish speedway season was the 2019 season of motorcycle speedway in Sweden.

Individual

Individual Championship
The 2019 Swedish Individual Speedway Championship final was held at the Credentia Arena in Hallstavik on 27 July 2019.

The title was won by Jacob Thorssell.

U21 Championship
 
Winner - Alexander Woentin

Team

Team Championship
Smederna won the Elitserien.

Griparna won the Allsvenskan (second tier league).

Play offs

References 

Speedway competitions in Sweden
Speedway leagues
Professional sports leagues in Sweden
Swedish
speedway
Seasons in Swedish speedway